Clinton Cerejo is an Indian singer, music composer and musician.

Life
Clinton Cerejo was born into an academically inclined family with no known musical background. His father was an engineer at L&T and mother is a French professor. His elder brother is a software professional and his younger sister is an editor for medical journals in the United States.

He completed his graduation in Commerce from Poddar College in Mumbai and was on his way to pursue a degree in M.B.A before his friends convinced him of his musical talent.

During his younger days, he was influenced by great producers such as Quincy Jones, Trevor Horn, Arif Mardin, Stevie Wonder, Babyface, Hugh Padgham, Peter Gabriel, Roland Orzabal, and Roy Thomas Baker.

Clinton married Dominique Cerejo, who was his college friend and is now an established singer.

Career
During his time at college, he would often have jam sessions with his friend Siddharth Haldipur (of music director duo Sangeet-Siddharth fame). It was on one such session that Amar Haldipur (Siddharth's father), who is a famous arranger and violinist, noticed Clinton and took a liking to his voice. Amar introduced Clinton to Anand Modak, the music director of a Marathi film Mukta and soon he was performing his first song in a recording studio. It was an English song for a Marathi film, picturised on an African-American.

After a series of sporadic recordings, he started lending his voice to many advertisement jingles. During this period he worked with Shankar–Ehsaan–Loy, Lezz Lewis, Ranjit Barot & Louis Banks. Some of his contemporaries at that time were KK and Kunal Ganjawala, who went on to become playback singers. Clinton and Kunal sang a lot of jingles together.

Realizing that his voice was not versatile enough to be a successful jingle singer, he started looking at other areas of interest.

A. R. Rahman, while working in an adjoining studio, happened to overhear one of Clinton's vocal arrangements for a song and when they met a month later, offered Clinton the opportunity to work with him. Soon his work was noticed by many and other projects followed.

Eventually Clinton went on to work with many leading Indian music composers performing various roles in the music department. Later on he composed various songs which were featured in Coke studio. One of the famous songs is "Madari", sung by Vishal Dadlani and Sonu Kakkar.

Discography

As composer

Films

Non-film work

As music producer (For other composers)

Singer

Awards and nominations

References

External links
 Official Website of Clinton Cerejo
 
 In Conversation with Clinton Cerejo – Music Aloud's interview
 Clinton Cerejo: The mehnat behind the music – An exclusive Drift interview
 Rediff interview with Clinton Cerejo

Indian male playback singers
Indian music arrangers
Living people
Musicians from Mumbai
Bollywood playback singers
Indian film score composers
Indian male film score composers
Year of birth missing (living people)